José Lopes da Silva Trovão, better known as Lopes Trovão (May 23, 1848 – July 17, 1925), was a Brazilian doctor, journalist, and politician.

He was the son of Portuguese diplomats José Maria dos Reis Lopes Trovão and Maria Jacinta Lopes Trovão. He supported the Republican Manifesto of 1870 and was a noted orator, speaking out against the monarchy and slavery. Lopes Trovão served in the chamber of deputies between 1891 and 1895. He was a senator from 1895 to 1902.

He worked on a design for the Brazilian flag which was first presented in November 1889. It was adopted for four days and became known as the Provisional Flag of the Republic.  Ultimately it was rejected as too similar to the U.S. flag upon which it was based.

In his later years, Trovao served on the executive boards of several newspapers. He died in Rio de Janeiro in 1925. A school was named after him in 1908. A medal is awarded in his name, presented in his hometown of Angra dos Reis.

References

External links
Galeria republicana

1848 births
1925 deaths
Brazilian abolitionists
Brazilian journalists
19th-century Brazilian physicians
Members of the Chamber of Deputies (Brazil) from Rio de Janeiro (state)
Members of the Federal Senate (Brazil)
People from Angra dos Reis